Prorella emmedonia is a moth in the family Geometridae first described by John Arthur Grossbeck in 1908. It is found in the US states of California and Arizona.

The wingspan is about 17 mm. The forewings are pale whitish crossed by two oblique, blackish bands. Adults have been recorded on wing in August and September.

References

Eupitheciini
Moths of North America
Moths described in 1908